John Joseph Ryan  (1853–1902) was an American outfielder from 1873 to 1877 in the National Association and the National League.
After retiring from baseball, Ryan joined the Philadelphia Police Department in March 1891, becoming a well-liked and respected officer. Ryan died while on duty, after being kicked in the stomach while trying to arrest Charles Hemple, who started a fight in a pub.

References

External links

1853 births
1902 deaths
Major League Baseball left fielders
19th-century baseball players
Philadelphia White Stockings players
Baltimore Canaries players
New Haven Elm Citys players
Louisville Grays players
Cincinnati Reds (1876–1879) players
Baseball players from Philadelphia
Philadelphia Athletic players
Pittsburgh Allegheny players
American murder victims
People murdered in Pennsylvania
American police officers killed in the line of duty
Deaths by beating in the United States
1902 murders in the United States